James Carl Newhook (2 June 1915 – 17 May 1997) was a New Zealand veterinary scientist, university lecturer and writer.

References

1915 births
1997 deaths
New Zealand veterinarians